Machida (written: 町田 lit. "town ricefield") is a Japanese surname. Notable people with the surname include:

, Japanese judge
Emi Machida (町田 恵美), Japanese toji or master sake brewer
, Japanese politician
, Japanese writer and musician
, Japanese-Brazilian mixed martial artist
, Japanese basketball player
, Japanese novelist
, Japanese footballer
, Japanese footballer
, Japanese figure skater
, Japanese screenwriter
, Japanese footballer
, Japanese musician and artist

Japanese-language surnames